Bruno Souza (born 24 June 1977) is a Brazilian handball player who plays for the Brazilian national team. He was born in Rio de Janeiro. He participated at the 2004 Summer Olympics, where Brazil placed 10th, and at the 2008 Summer Olympics, where the Brazilian team placed 11th.

References

External links

1977 births
Living people
Sportspeople from Rio de Janeiro (city)
Brazilian male handball players
Olympic handball players of Brazil
Handball players at the 2004 Summer Olympics
Handball players at the 2008 Summer Olympics
Handball players at the 2003 Pan American Games
Handball players at the 2007 Pan American Games
Pan American Games medalists in handball
Pan American Games gold medalists for Brazil
Medalists at the 2007 Pan American Games
21st-century Brazilian people